The 1909–10 season was Blackpool F.C.'s 13th season (tenth consecutive) in the Football League. They competed in the twenty-team Division Two, then the second tier of English football, finishing twelfth.

Jack Cox took on the role of player-manager for the first time, succeeding club secretary Tom Barcroft.

Walter Miller was the club's top scorer, with fourteen goals, including a hat-trick against Leeds City at Bloomfield Road on New Year's Day, 1910.

Season synopsis
Blackpool won four of their opening five league games, before failing to win any of the six games to follow. Another sequence of note was a four-game win streak between 26 March and 16 April, which assisted in their mid-table finish. In addition, they beat and drew their two matches against the eventual champions, Manchester City.

The club's FA Cup campaign ended at the first-round stage. After drawing 1–1 with Barnsley at Bloomfield Road on 15 January, they lost the replay 0–6.

Table

Player statistics

Appearances

League
Fiske – 38
Crewdson – 10
Whittingham – 25
Threlfall – 31
Connor – 35
Clarke – 38
Morley – 32
Beare – 34
Miller – 31
Elmore – 34
Dawson – 13
Gladwin – 16
Cox – 25
Drain – 4
Burt – 6
Evans – 4
Goulding – 13
Didymus – 3
Shaw – 2
Bradshaw – 2
Wolstenholme – 9
Dale – 12
Hoad – 1

Players used: 23

FA Cup
Fiske – 2
Whittingham – 2
Threlfall – 2
Connor – 2
Clarke – 2
Beare – 2
Miller – 2
Dawson – 2
Gladwin – 1
Goulding – 1
Wolstenholme – 2
Hoad – 2

Players used: 12

Goals

League
Miller – 14
Beare – 9
Morley – 7
Elmore – 6
Connor – 4
Dawson – 4
Cox – 3
Burt – 2
Wolstenholme – 1

League goals scored: 50

FA Cup
Wolstenholme – 1

FA Cup goals scored: 1

Transfers

In

Out

Notes

References

Blackpool F.C.
Blackpool F.C. seasons